Daqiao is a town in  Dong'e County in western Shandong province, China, located on the northern (left) bank of the Yellow River about  east-southeast of the county seat and just across the river from Pingyin County. The town is served by China National Highway 105 . , it has 31 villages under its administration.

See also 
 List of township-level divisions of Shandong

References 

Township-level divisions of Shandong
Dong'e County